Stirlingville is an unincorporated community in central Alberta, Canada within Mountain View County.

See also 
 List of communities in Alberta

Localities in Mountain View County